Abdoul Fessal Tapsoba (born 23 August 2001) is a Burkinabé professional footballer who plays as a forward for Moldovan Super Liga side Sheriff Tiraspol, on loan from Standard Liége, and the Burkina Faso national team.

Club career
Tapsoba began his career with Ivorian club ASEC Mimosas in the Ivorian Ligue 1. On 28 November 2018, Tapsoba scored his first goal for the club in the CAF Champions League against Mangasport. His 5th-minute goal was enough in a 1–0 victory. In September 2019, Tapsoba was loaned out to Belgian side Standard Liège and mainly played with the reserve side. After the season ended, Tapsoba was signed permanently by Standard Liège.

Tapsoba made his professional debut for Standard on 8 August 2020 against Cercle Brugge. He came on as a 78th minute substitute for Maxime Lestienne as Standard Liège won 1–0.

On 3 February 2023, Tapsoba was loaned to Sheriff Tiraspol in Moldova, with an option to buy.

International career
Tapsoba made his debut for Burkina Faso national team on 29 March 2021 in an AFCON 2021 qualifier against South Sudan.

Tapsoba featured in the third place of 2021 AFCON game against Cameroon.

Career statistics

Club

International
Scores and results list Burkina Faso's goal tally first, score column indicates score after each Tapsoba goal.

References

External links

2001 births
People from Bobo-Dioulasso
21st-century Burkinabé people
Living people
Burkinabé footballers
Burkina Faso international footballers
Association football forwards
ASEC Mimosas players
Standard Liège players
FC Sheriff Tiraspol players
Belgian Pro League players
Challenger Pro League players
2021 Africa Cup of Nations players
Burkinabé expatriate footballers
Burkinabé expatriate sportspeople in Ivory Coast
Expatriate footballers in Ivory Coast
Burkinabé expatriate sportspeople in Belgium
Expatriate footballers in Belgium
Burkinabé expatriate sportspeople in Moldova
Expatriate footballers in Moldova